The Ambassador Extraordinary and Plenipotentiary of the Russian Federation to the Republic of Moldova is the official representative of the President and the Government of the Russian Federation to the President and the Government of Moldova.

The ambassador and his staff work at large in the Embassy of Russia in Chișinău.

History of diplomatic relations

With the dissolution of the Soviet Union in 1991, diplomatic relations between the Russian Federation and the Republic of Moldova were first established on 6 April 1992, with the first Russian ambassador to Moldova, having been appointed on 18 March 1992. In 2012, a consulate in was opened in Tiraspol, de facto capital of the separatist region of Transnistria, despite the objections of the Moldovan government.

Representatives of the Russian Federation to the Republic of Moldova (1992 – present)

References

 
Moldova
Russia